Peacocke is a semi-rural suburb in southern Hamilton in New Zealand. Peacocke was brought into the city boundaries in 1989. It is one of the future urban zones of Hamilton, along with Rotokauri.

By 2020 the granting of the consent had been appealed to the Environment Court, a major issue being protection of habitats for endangered long tailed bats.

History 
Nukuhau Pā is one of the best preserved pā sites on the Waikato. It is at the south end of Peacocke, beside the river. Ngāti Mahuta may have been occupied it around 1700, after which Ngati Raukawa conquered it, or it may have belonged to Ngāti Ruru and been taken back by Ngāti Māhanga. It was reported as abandoned about 1830, at the time of the musket wars. After the 1863 invasion of the Waikato it was confiscated.

The land was acquired in 1868 by Colonel de Quincy, who named it “Weston Lea” after his grandmother’s English home, near Bath. In 1887, Fitzroy Peacocke, a son of Captain Peacocke, bought the land from the Colonel, who was step-father of his wife, Florence Henrietta. However, they didn't move there until 1889 and the farm was for sale 3 years later. Their son, Egerton Peacocke, took on the farm in 1905 and cleared much of the bush to form a dairy farm. His brother Noel, an architect, designed a new homestead, built in 1912.

Demographics

Peacockes had a population of 348 at the 2018 New Zealand census, an increase of 21 people (6.4%) since the 2013 census, and an increase of 57 people (19.6%) since the 2006 census. There were 138 households, comprising 168 males and 183 females, giving a sex ratio of 0.92 males per female. The median age was 44.8 years (compared with 37.4 years nationally), with 63 people (18.1%) aged under 15 years, 57 (16.4%) aged 15 to 29, 150 (43.1%) aged 30 to 64, and 78 (22.4%) aged 65 or older.

Ethnicities were 90.5% European/Pākehā, 12.9% Māori, 1.7% Pacific peoples, 7.8% Asian, and 2.6% other ethnicities. People may identify with more than one ethnicity.

The percentage of people born overseas was 18.1, compared with 27.1% nationally.

Although some people chose not to answer the census's question about religious affiliation, 49.1% had no religion, 41.4% were Christian, 0.9% were Buddhist and 1.7% had other religions.

Of those at least 15 years old, 84 (29.5%) people had a bachelor's or higher degree, and 51 (17.9%) people had no formal qualifications. The median income was $38,200, compared with $31,800 nationally. 63 people (22.1%) earned over $70,000 compared to 17.2% nationally. The employment status of those at least 15 was that 135 (47.4%) people were employed full-time, 48 (16.8%) were part-time, and 9 (3.2%) were unemployed.

See also
 Suburbs of Hamilton, New Zealand

References

Suburbs of Hamilton, New Zealand
Populated places on the Waikato River